The Burglar  is a 1972 Dutch film directed by Frans Weisz.

Plot summary

Cast
 Rijk de Gooyer ... Willem "Glimmie" Burg
 Jon Bluming ... De Bonk
 Frits Lambrechts
 Bob De Lange
 Jennifer Willems

References

External links 
 
 

Dutch crime thriller films
1972 films
1970s Dutch-language films
Films directed by Frans Weisz